Pavel Aleksandrovich Gerasimov (b. May 29, 1979, Aleksin, Tula Oblast) is a Russian athlete competing in the pole vault.

The 1998 world junior champion, Gerasimov won his first senior medal, a bronze medal, at the 2005 World Championships. His personal best of 5.90 was achieved in August 2000.

References

External links

Living people
1979 births
Sportspeople from Tula, Russia
Russian male pole vaulters
Olympic male pole vaulters
Olympic athletes of Russia
Athletes (track and field) at the 2000 Summer Olympics
Athletes (track and field) at the 2004 Summer Olympics
World Athletics Championships athletes for Russia
World Athletics Championships medalists
World Athletics U20 Championships winners
Russian Athletics Championships winners